Saipa Tehran Athletic and Cultural Club is an Iranian multisport club based in Tehran and Karaj, Iran. The club was founded in 1989.

Teams
Saipa Football Club, competing in the Iran Pro League
Saipa Volleyball Club, competing in the Iranian Super League
Saipa Auto Racing Club
Saipa Athletics Club

External links
Official website

Multi-sport clubs in Iran
Sports clubs established in 1989